Sternbergia colchiciflora is a bulbous flowering plant in the family Amaryllidaceae, subfamily Amaryllidoideae, which is sometimes used as an ornamental plant. The species is native to southern Europe from Spain to Ukraine, as well as from Morocco, Algeria, Turkey, Syria, Lebanon, Palestine, Iran and the Caucasus. It has yellow flowers which appear in autumn.

References

Amaryllidoideae
Flora of Hungary
Flora of France
Flora of Spain
Flora of Southeastern Europe
Flora of the Crimean Peninsula
Flora of Ukraine
Flora of Algeria
Flora of Morocco
Flora of the Caucasus
Flora of Western Asia